ent-Pimara-8(14),15-diene synthase (EC 4.2.3.30, OsKS5) is an enzyme with systematic name ent-copalyl-diphosphate diphosphate-lyase [ent-pimara-8(14),15-diene-forming]. This enzyme catalyses the following chemical reaction

  ent-copalyl diphosphate  ent-pimara-8(14),15-diene + diphosphate

This diterpene cyclase produces only ent-pimara-8(14),15-diene.

References

External links 
 

EC 4.2.3